Taeniopoda eques, the western horse lubber grasshopper, is a relatively large grasshopper species of the family Romaleidae found in the arid lower Sonoran life zone of the southwestern United States and northern Mexico. Northern populations are identifiable by their shiny black bodies and black and yellow reticulated forewings. Some southern populations are yellow in the adult stage. The species is unique in using its black coloration to thermoregulate and in being chemically defended. The aposematic coloration warns vertebrate predators of its unpalatability and allows the grasshopper to roost conspicuously upon desert shrubs.

Etymology
T. eques was first described by Hermann Burmeister in 1838. The vernacular lubber refers to the flightless terrestrial status of the subfamily Romaleinae. Eques is the Latin term for "horseman".

Description
Taeniopoda eques is one of the largest grasshopper species in North America. A female of the species can reach 7 centimeters in length and weigh 9 grams. The mature male weighs 3 grams on average. There is a wide range of sizes due to influences in its specific habitat. Males stridulate more commonly than females by expanding the hindwings against the closed forewings, thus flashing the bright red hindwings. It is unique among desert grasshoppers because of its conspicuous size and coloring. The body is mostly black, with finely patterned black and yellow forewings with green veins and red hindwings with black borders. The antennae and head of the adult include orange markings. The forewings of males normally extend past the tip of the abdomen. However, most T. eques cannot fly, with only approximately 10 percent of males possessing wings long enough for flight. The T. eques nymph resembles the adult in coloration, except the nymph also possesses yellow head markings and black antennae.

Distribution and habitat
Taeniopoda eques ranges from southern Arizona, New Mexico, and Texas to central Mexico, and inhabits the lower Sonoran life zone, which consists primarily of sparse desert brush and grasslands. It can be found among Acacia, Mimosa, Ephedra, and Yucca shrubs. In the United States, this grasshopper species is the only member of its genus (Taeniopoda) and one of the largest arthropods. In the United States, it inhabits the Chihuahuan Desert community from southern Arizona to the Big Bend region of Texas. The Chihuahuan Desert receives a high amount of summer precipitation compared to other deserts, which is necessary for the grasshopper's development.

Diet
Taeniopoda eques does not feed on the same plants it roosts on. In an experiment, it was found to be unable to survive on Acacia and Mimosa shrubs alone. It feeds mainly on foliage, flowers, and seed pods of low-growing summer desert annuals. T. eques only forages during daylight hours; at night it roosts near the tops of desert shrubs to hide from nocturnal ground predators. At dawn, it descends to the desert floor to feed on the annual plant species which are abundant following summer rains. T. eques drink free-standing water from raindrops. T. eques is known to be polyphagous, and also consumes a variety of other material, including spider silk and feces. It is an opportunistic carnivore and can occasionally be found scavenging for insect and vertebrate cadavers. It can detect odors to find mammal and insect carcasses, which may provide a source of protein and nitrogen in the diet. The female is more likely engage in scavenger behavior than the male T. eques. This difference may be explained by the female's greater need for protein and other nutrients to facilitate more rapid maturation and egg production. Cannibalism has been observed upon molting or incapacitated individuals of its own species.

Life cycle
Taeniopoda eques is univoltine, producing only one brood of offspring per year. Females lay eggs at the base of shrubs or large rocks, depositing the approximately 50 eggs in a single pod 4-8 centimeters deep into the soil. The females also eject a liquid with the eggs, which dries and forms a hard case protecting the egg pod. In the United States, eggs are deposited in subterranean egg pods in October. The number of egg pods laid is dependent upon the rate of development in the adults and the time available before the frost sets in. The grasshoppers reach maturity in October and die in November during the winter freeze. Thermoregulation is necessary for speeding the development of T. eques to increase its reproductive chances before the favorable growing season ends.

Along with the onset of the summer rainy season, the young hatch in synchrony from subterranean egg pods in July. The larvae are especially vulnerable to predatory ants for about the first three minutes after hatching. After shedding the provisional cuticle, the larvae climb up the nearest vertical object. They are born reddish in color, but transform to black within two hours.

Despite its large size, T. eques has a relatively speedy rate of larval development, undergoing five nymphal molts to reach the adult stage in about 40 days. Recently molted individuals are brown but darken within two hours at warm temperatures. Temperature influences whether they can complete the molting process. At temperatures less than 25 °C, molting is usually not initiated. At temperatures above 36 °C, they can become stuck in old exoskeletons. Individuals are exposed to predation and sibling cannibalism during molting. T. eques is different from other aposematic grasshoppers in its asynchronous molting.

Mating begins about 12 days after maturity, and about 30 days after the adults molt, females begin laying egg pods each containing about 50 eggs. Egg pods are deposited 6 to 9 centimeters underground. Females continue to lay subsequent egg pods at 18-day intervals until they are killed by the freeze in November.

Behavior

Thermoregulation
Thermoregulation is necessary for all essential life functions of T. eques and most other behaviors, including food consumption and digestion, predator escape, reproduction, walking, flying, and ovipositing. The desert environment of T. eques is often unpredictable and allows the grasshopper only about four months, the time between the onset of the summer rains and the arrival of the winter freeze, to complete its entire life cycle. Growth and development are further slowed by cold desert nights, and in October, cold days. T. eques speed development by solar basking, aided by its black heat-absorbing coloration. By thermoregulating, the grasshopper can maintain an optimal body temperature between 30 and 40 degrees Celsius for most of the day. Elevating body temperature for extended periods allows T. eques to metabolize faster, thus permitting maximum growth and reproduction before the onset of winter. Without thermoregulation, T. eques could not survive in its northern range.

The unique black coloration of T. eques is thermally beneficial, contributing to the species' shorter larval development compared to the light- colored desert grasshoppers. T. eques has also developed behavioral thermoregulatory mechanisms for sunlight exposure. Flanking occurs when the grasshopper orients its body perpendicular to sunlight, maximizing thoracic heat gain. The sun-side hindleg is lowered, the shade-side hindleg is raised, and the abdomen is lowered to reduce wing shading. Moving into the centers of bushes allows for shading to limit sun exposure at midday to prevent overheating.

Defense
Ants regularly attack hatching and molting nymphs. Vertebrates sharing the habitat of T. eques rarely disturb horse lubbers and prefer other lubber grasshopper species instead. Only invertebrates and grasshopper mice have been shown to be undeterred by adult T. eques defenses.

T. eques possesses a multi-sensory defense system. The chemical secretion has a strong coffee-vanilla odor and composed of a complex mixture of synthesized phenolics and plant toxins produced from the grasshopper's diet. When consumed, the toxic tissues of T. eques cause vomiting or death in predators. The species relies on a comprehensive aposematic display containing chemical deterrents, and visual and auditory elements for defense against vertebrate predators. For example, when attacked by mice, the grasshoppers spray the odorous secretion from their metathoracic spiracles while producing a hissing noise. The secretion surrounds the insect in a noxious deterrent cloud. Adults also turn sideways to predators and display their bright red hindwings while waving their bright antennae and spiny hindlegs in a threatening manner. Together these signals warn naïve predators and remind experienced predators of the grasshopper's toxicity.

Social behavior
In the first stage of life, pod mates aggregate and move and feed together, but disperse after a few days. Aggregation is tightest in this first-instar period and may be a method of defense for the vulnerable developing grasshoppers. Thereafter they are solitary, although mature T. eques are attracted to the largest bush at dusk which provides the appearance of clumping. This behavior may provide benefits of increasing opportunities for mating and enhancing aposematic displays against predators.

Sexual behavior and pheromones
Both sexes of mature T. eques engage in promiscuous behavior. Males are sexually aggressive, actively mounting females and males of the species as well as individuals from other grasshopper and lizard species.

Males cautiously stalk females before suddenly mounting without any communicatory leg or wing signaling. Females react violently when mounted by jumping, kicking, running, and rotating from side to side.
However, immediately following copulation, females become docile and carry males on their backs. Males do not guard ovipositing females.

The female T. eques releases a pheromone that elicits male attraction and sexual behavior over a short distance. Male T. eques can remain in copulation for up to 24 hours, continuously passing spermatophores to the female.

Trait interaction
Multiple phenotypic traits interact in T. eques since chemical defense from vertebrates releases the species from the need to be small and hidden. Thus T. eques has evolved a large body size, to increase fecundity, deter small invertebrate predators, increase water retention, and allow for deep ovipositing. However, the large adult size requires long development and growth, which is difficult in its short season. It speeds growth by thermoregulation mechanisms including dark color and solar exposure positions, both allowed only because of chemical defense. These features cause T. eques to be conspicuous; however, chemical deterrents protect it against predators. The species can allocate resources to reproduction instead of wings and flight muscles. As with many other chemically defended insects, T. eques is flightless and sluggish.

References

External links

Encyclopedia of Life Taeniopoda eques
BugGuide Taeniopoda eques

Romaleidae
Insects described in 1838
Orthoptera of North America
Taxa named by Hermann Burmeister